DZNC (801 AM) Bombo Radyo is a radio station owned and operated by Bombo Radyo Philippines through its licensee Newsounds Broadcasting Network. Its studio and transmitter are located at the Bombo Radyo Broadcast Center, National Highway, Brgy. Minante II, Cauayan, Isabela.

References

Radio stations in Isabela (province)
Radio stations established in 1968
News and talk radio stations in the Philippines